Donau may refer to:
Danube (German: Donau), Europe's second-longest river
Donau (horse) (1907–1913), American thoroughbred racehorse
SS Donau, the name of several steamships
, a modern German replenishment ship
RC Donau, an Austrian rugby club in Vienna
Donau Arena, an arena in Regensburg, Germany
Donau City, a part of Vienna, Austria
 (born 1946), German footballer

See also
 
 
 Danube (disambiguation)
Dunino, Poland (German: Dohnau), a village in Gmina Krotoszyce, Lower Silesian Voivodeship
SS-Oberabschnitt Donau, the primary division command of the Allgemeine-SS in Austria
Donau-Ries, a district in Bavaria, Germany
Alb-Donau-Kreis, a district in Baden-Württemberg, Germany